Polangui station is a railway station located on the South Main Line in Albay, Philippines. It is still used for the Bicol Commuter.

History
Polangui was opened on November, 1914 as part of the Legazpi Division Line, the station building was reconstructed and reopened on September 18, 2015.

Philippine National Railways stations
Railway stations in Albay